The 2017 European Junior and U23 Canoe Slalom Championships took place in Hohenlimburg, Germany from 17 to 20 August 2017 under the auspices of the European Canoe Association (ECA). It was the 19th edition of the competition for Juniors (U18) and the 15th edition for the Under 23 category. The men's C2 team events did not take place. The men's C2 junior event did not count as a medal event due to insufficient number of participating countries. An event must have at least 5 nations taking part in order to count as a medal event.

Medal summary

Men

Canoe

Junior

U23

Kayak

Junior

U23

Women

Canoe

Junior

U23

Kayak

Junior

U23

Medal table

References

External links
Official website
European Canoe Association

European Junior and U23 Canoe Slalom Championships
European Junior and U23 Canoe Slalom Championships